Katherine Singer Kovács Society for Cinema and Media Studies Book Award is a prestigious book award that is given annually for outstanding scholarship in cinema and media studies. The award is made annually by the Society for Cinema and Media Studies  and includes a prize of 1500 dollars. The prize is named in honour of Katherine Singer Kovács.

Award
 2022 
 2021  
 2020 
 2019 
 2018 
 2017 
 2016 
 2015 
 2014 
 2013 
 2012 '
 2011 
 2010 
 2009

See also
 Katherine Singer Kovács Prize

References

Media studies
American non-fiction literary awards
Awards established in 2009